The 1966–67 SM-sarja season was the 36th season of the SM-sarja, the top level of ice hockey in Finland. 12 teams participated in the league, and RU-38 Pori won the championship.

Regular season

External links
 Season on hockeyarchives.info

Fin
Liiga seasons
SM